The Embassy of the Republic of Indonesia in The Hague is the diplomatic mission of the Republic of Indonesia to the Netherlands. The embassy is located in Scheveningen district of The Hague and is currently headed by Ambassador Mayerfas which was appointed by President Joko Widodo on 14 September 2020.

History 

Indonesia established diplomatic relations with the Netherlands as a republic in 1949 after Dutch–Indonesian Round Table Conference where the Dutch formally recognized Indonesia's sovereignty. Its first ambassador was Mohammad Roem which took office in 1950.

References

See also 

 Indonesia–Netherlands relations
 List of diplomatic missions of Indonesia

Indonesia
Netherlands
Indonesia–Netherlands relations
Rijksmonuments in The Hague